Bonnie Judd is a Canadian animal trainer known for training dogs to act in films and commercials. She founded and runs the company Canine Co-Stars, based in Aldergrove, British Columbia, Canada, in the Fraser Valley area. Through this company, she has trained dogs and a variety of other animals, including monkeys and turtles, to successfully act in films. She has trained dogs to act in films including Air Bud: World Pup (2000), Good Boy! (2003), and A Dog's Journey (2019), for which she served as animal coordinator. She has also trained a variety of animals, including dogs, pixie toads, and sheep, to act in commercials.

References

External links

Living people
Animal trainers
People from Langley, British Columbia (district municipality)
Dog trainers
Year of birth missing (living people)
Canadian women in film